Port Royale is a business simulation game set in the Caribbean and partly the Atlantic during the 16th and 17th centuries. It combines business–economic simulation with real-time battles and towns that can be visited for trade and other purposes.

Publication history
The game was created by Ascaron Entertainment in 2002. The sequel Port Royale 2 was released over a year after in September 2004.

On August 2, 2011 the publisher Kalypso Media who purchased many of the licenses and assets from Ascaron Entertainment during its insolvency, announced that they had acquired the licences of the Port Royale installment. They announced also that they were already working on the third title, named "Port Royale 3". This released on May 4, 2012.

Gameplay
It is an open-ended game and the players can choose any type of career that they wish, including trading and interactions with pirates (including privateering).

There are also many other activities in the game besides trading or hunting down pirates. Players can visit governors in towns and accept missions from them as long as their reputation with the country is good enough. Missions include armed transport and tracking down lost relatives that have been kidnapped by an NPC called Axesmith (whom the player can choose, eventually, to defeat outright in battle). Treasure maps, purchased in pieces from around the game board, can also lead to newfound wealth and even the creation of a private port.

An important part of the game are the colonial nations in the Caribbean (Spain, France, England and The Netherlands) and their relationships.

There are a total of 12 different ship types available to players, of increasing cost, efficacy in battle and room for cargo. They range from the small pinnace, to a large ship of the line.

Reception

The game received "generally favorable reviews" according to the review aggregation website Metacritic.

The editors of GameSpot named Port Royale the best computer game of June 2003, and later nominated the game for their 2003 "Best Game No One Played" award, which ultimately went to Amplitude.

See also
Video gaming in Germany

References

External links
Official Website

2002 video games
Ascaron games
Video games set in the 16th century
Age of Discovery video games
Business simulation games
Trade simulation games
Video games about pirates
Video games developed in Germany
Video games set in the Caribbean
Windows games
Windows-only games
Tri Synergy games
Multiplayer and single-player video games